Yehoshua Ḥana Rawnitzki (13 September 1859 – 4 May 1944) was a Hebrew publisher, editor, and collaborator of Hayim Nahman Bialik.

Biography
Yehoshua Ḥana Rawnitzki was born to a poor Jewish family in Odessa in 1859. He began his journalistic career in 1879, by contributing first to Ha-Kol, and then to other periodicals. He was the editor and publisher of Pardes, a literary collection best known for publishing Hayim Nahman Bialik's first poem, "El ha-Tzippor," in 1892. With Sholem Aleichem (under the pseudonym Eldad), Rawnitzki (under the pseudonym Medad) published a series of feuilletons entitled Kevurat Soferim ("The Burial of Writers"). From 1908 through 1911, Rawnitzki and Bialik published Sefer Ha-Aggadah ("The Book of Legends") a compilation of aggadah from the Mishnah, the two Talmuds and the Midrash literature.

Rawnitzki moved to Palestine in 1921, where he took part in the founding of the Dvir publishing house. He died there in May 1944.

References

External links

1859 births
1944 deaths
People from Odesa
Odesa Jews
19th-century publishers (people)
19th-century journalists
Hebrew-language writers
Ukrainian emigrants to Mandatory Palestine
Journalists from the Russian Empire
Writers from the Russian Empire
Israeli writers
Jewish folklorists
Jewish Russian writers
Jewish Ukrainian writers
Members of the Assembly of Representatives (Mandatory Palestine)
Ukrainian Jews
Yiddish-language journalists
Burials at Trumpeldor Cemetery